is a former Japanese football player.

Club statistics

References

External links

1983 births
Living people
Association football people from Gunma Prefecture
Japanese footballers
J2 League players
Japan Football League players
Honda FC players
Thespakusatsu Gunma players
Arte Takasaki players
Association football midfielders